Mirifenestella is an extinct genus of bryozoans from the Devonian period, belonging to the order Fenestrata. Like some other fenestrate bryozoans, it produced a skeletal superstructure that protected the colony. It also developed specialized zooids known as "aviculomorphs" which occurred in pairs and may have been either for cleaning or defense purposes.

References

Prehistoric bryozoan genera
Stenolaemata